Malaysia–New Zealand relations (Jawi: هوبوڠن مليسيا–نيوزيلندا) refers to foreign relations between Malaysia and New Zealand. Malaysia has a High Commission in Wellington, and New Zealand has a High Commission in Kuala Lumpur. Both countries are full members of the Commonwealth of Nations and Malaysia is important to New Zealand for strategic, political and economic reasons, with both countries' leaders were engaged in frequent visits to boost their relations.

Country comparison

History 

Official diplomatic relations between Malaysia and New Zealand has been established since 25 September 1957, with Malaysia remains as one of the oldest partner for New Zealand in Southeast Asia. The New Zealand Defence Force (NZDF) has maintained its presence since the 1950s to fight alongside its allies from the threat of communism in the Malayan Emergency, Second Malayan Emergency and Sarawak Communist Insurgency. Following the path of the formation of the Malaysian federation, the NZDF also defended the British Malaya and Borneo from the Indonesian military infiltration.

Trade and Economic relations 
The economic relations between the two countries also underpinned by four free trade agreements, including:

 The Malaysia–New Zealand Free Trade Agreement.
 The ASEAN-Australia-New Zealand Free Trade Area (AANZFTA).
 The Regional Comprehensive Economic Partnership (RCEP).
 The Comprehensive and Progressive Agreement for Trans-Pacific Partnership (CPTPP).
The trade and economic relationship between Malaysia and New Zealand is strong. This is in part because Malaysia occupies an influential position within the Association of Southeast Asian Nations (ASEAN), and is well-known to New Zealanders. In 2005, Malaysia and New Zealand initiated discussions on a bilateral free-trade agreement. On 6 August 2020 Malaysia and New Zealand completed an Exchange of Letters to amend Article 1 of Annex 3 of the Malaysia New Zealand Free Trade Agreement. The amendment to Annex 3 enterred into force on 1 October 2020.

In 2012, Malaysia was New Zealand's eighth-largest trading partner with Malaysia's exports comprising petroleum, computer and television equipment and palm oil worth around NZ$1.84 Billion, while New Zealand exports to Malaysia stood at NZ$888 million, consisting of dairy products, meat and scrap metal. A free trade agreement between the two countries was signed on 26 October 2009 in Kuala Lumpur, and enterred into force in August 2010. Many New Zealand companies have a significant presence in Malaysia, primarily in the food, telecommunications and ICTs sectors. The Free Trade Agreement aimed to encourage two-way investment between Malaysia and New Zealand.

The total bilateral trade between two countries in 2016 stood at US$1.42 billion with exports amounted to US$730 million, while imports amounted to US$680 million. In 2017, the two countries expressed their interest to expand the collaboration in ICTs and tourism sectors. In the same year, New Zealand economic relations with Malaysia is also being discovered in other areas such as food (mainly dairies products) and beverage sector and both countries announced their intention to fosters stronger business and cultural links between them. A cultural exchange between Māori and the indigenous people of the Malaysian state of Sabah have been held in Kota Kinabalu. New Zealand welcomed a group of 15 delegates from the Malaysian state of Sarawak government for a meeting held in April 2019, to share and discuss common indigenous interests and co-operation.

Education relations 
Under the Colombo Plan, a large numbers of Malaysian students have were given the opportunity to study in New Zealand. New Zealand are working to attract more students from Malaysia as part of the country efforts to promote it as a first choice for foreign study. An arrangement on higher education co-operation was signed between the two countries in 2013. In 2019, further education relations are reinforced between New Zealand and the Malaysian State of Sarawak.

Security relations 

New Zealand and Malaysia are both members of the Five Power Defence Arrangements. New Zealand plays a key role in the frequent military exercises between the countries involved.

Incident 

In 2014, a Malaysian diplomat named Mohammed Rizalman Ismail was arrested by the New Zealand Police and charged with burglary and assault with intent to rape after allegedly following a 21-year-old woman, Tania Billingsley to her home.

See also 
 Malaysian New Zealanders

References

External links 
 Malaysia High Commission in Wellington, New Zealand
 New Zealand High Commission in Kuala Lumpur, Malaysia

 
New Zealand 
Bilateral relations of New Zealand
New Zealand
Malaysia